Provincial road N481 is a Dutch provincial road in the province South Holland.

See also

References

External links

481